ZM Wellington (previously 2ZM, ZMFM and 91ZM) is a hit music radio station in Wellington, New Zealand. It is a station of the ZM network, and is owned and operated by New Zealand Media and Entertainment.

History

Early years
The ZM station in Wellington has a history dating back to 1937 as local station 2YD which originally broadcast on 1130AM. The station was started by the New Zealand government owned Radio New Zealand (which at the time was known as the National Broadcasting Board). In 1969, the call sign was changed to 2ZM and in 1973, 2ZM was joined with 1YD and 3ZM in Christchurch to form to youth orientated ZM network, 1YD then became 1ZM.

The first 2ZM breakfast DJ (6 am to 9 am) was Stewart Macpherson, who had just returned from broadcasting in the UK with both the BBC and Radio Luxembourg. Using the show title 'Macphersonland', his innovations included introducing News Bulletins onto the station (despite management opposition), and a weekly published Top 40 chart available at leading music stores. In 1978, 2ZM moved to 1161 kHz after the AM band spacing in New Zealand was adjusted from 10 kHz to 9 kHz.

FM broadcasting
Wellington's 2ZM was the first ZM station to broadcast on FM from 21 December 1985 as ZMFM 91 (90.9). As the Mount Kaukau transmitter could not cover parts of the Hutt Valley effectively, the station continued to broadcast on AM until 1986, when a second transmitter at Towai (on the Wainuiomata Hill between Seaview and Wainuiomata) was commissioned broadcasting on 93.5 to cover the Hutt Valley. Its AM frequency (1161 kHz) was reallocated to Maori station Te Upoko o Te Ika. During the late eighties ZMFM relocated its studio from Broadcasting House to Alder House (on the corner of Vivian and Victoria streets in Wellington). Slogans used by ZMFM included Hit Radio, ZMFM The Music Leader, Rock of the Nineties ZMFM.

In late 1994, ZMFM Wellington became known as 91ZM sharing the same name that had been used in Christchurch since 1989, and the studios were relocated their current location on the corner of Taranaki and Abel Smith streets in Wellington.

In March 2007, ZM altered its Hutt Valley frequency from 93.5 to 90.9, to form a synchronous transmission with the signal from Mt Kaukau, also on 90.9. This meant that commuters no longer had to switch their radio dials between the two frequencies when driving between Wellington and the Hutt Valley. In June 2008, Easy Mix was networked on ZM's old 93.5 frequency.

Privatisation 
In July 1996, the New Zealand Government sold off the commercial arm of Radio New Zealand, which included, among other things, the ZM stations. The new owner was The Radio Network, a subsidiary of APN News & Media and Clear Channel Communications, which operated as a division of the Australian Radio Network.

90.6ZM Manawatu station
ZM originally commenced transmission to Manawatu on 9 March 1987, on 90.6 MHz. The program was a relay of the Wellington ZMFM station with local commercial breaks and station identification. ZMFM Manawatu also ran its own breakfast show – "Jackson and The Morning Crew" featuring Pete Jackson. In 1989, 90.6 ZMFM re-branded as 2 Double Q (2QQ), subsequently dropping the relay of ZMFM Wellington and beginning a seven-year absence of the ZM name in Manawatu. The ZM brand did not return to the Manawatu market until 1997 when Classic Rock Q91FM (formerly 2 Double Q) reverted to ZM (as 91ZM). The new ZM programme created in 1997 used a computerised automation system to provide a local programme recorded minutes before from the Wellington studio. 96ZM in Dunedin and Invercargill used a similar system to receive their programming from 91ZM Christchurch. In 2000, ZM switched to a single network feed with all networked ZM stations now receiving their programming from Auckland, as a result 91ZM Manawatu now contained the same programming as 91ZM Auckland instead of Wellington.

91.1ZM Kapiti station
ZM began broadcasting on its own frequency in the Kapiti region in 2004 with localised advertisement breaks for the Kapiti region. While ZM in Wellington did contain some local programming at this point the Kapiti station took all network programming from Auckland despite the 'Top of the Hour Station id' mentioning the Wellington 90.9FM frequency.

Past and present local announcers

During the 1980s, announcers Polly Gillespie, Grant Kereama and Nick Tansley joined ZMFM Wellington, and all three announcers were teamed up in the early 1990s, after the departure of Steve Parr to present the breakfast show. This show was very successful and has been a number 1 rating show in Wellington since the nineties. In 2001, the Wellington breakfast show became the new nationwide breakfast, originally Wellington ran their own local news breaks on the half-hour while the rest of the country used the Auckland-based ZM Newsbeat Service. For the first year the ZM Morning Crew show ran from 6am to 10am in Wellington but finished an hour earlier in the rest of New Zealand this was so Polly, Nick and Grant could present the final hour of their show to a Wellington only audience.

Outside breakfast programming remained local but between 2003 and 2009, local content was reduced to a point where from 2009 the breakfast show was the only show to come out of Wellington. Wellington did run their own local news service until 2006 when this was replaced with the networked Newsbeat. In April 2014, Polly and Grant moved to The Hits (formerly known as Classic Hits) and ZM launched their new breakfast show produced by Fletch, Vaughan and Megan out of Auckland. Polly and Grant presented their nationwide breakfast show on The Hits from Wellington until they left in 2017, later moving to More FM. As a result, the ZM Wellington studios are no longer used.

Breakfast 6am10am:
19691972: Stewart Macpherson (show ran 6am9am)
19821984: JR (James Ring) & Anne Marie (St Ledger-Higgens)
19851987: Mark MacLeod, Sue Bergin
late 1980s  early 1990s: Steve Parr, Polly Gillespie and Nick Tansley
early 1990s2003: Nick Tansley – Breakfast co-host on Polly and Grants show
early 1990s2014: Polly Gillespie and Grant Kereama
20042014: Mark Peard (show producer)
2014 onwards: Networked from Auckland
Daytime 10am3pm:
 19961999: Justin Rae
 19992003: Aroha Hathaway
 20032008: Simon O'neil
 2008 onwards: Networked from Auckland
Drive 3pm7pm:
 19921996: Sandy Antipas
 19982003: Julian Burn
 2003 onwards: Networked from Auckland
Nights 7pmmidnight:
 19961998: Dallas Gurney
 1998 onwards: Networked from Auckland

References

Wellington, ZM
Radio stations in Wellington